Bacchisa melanura is a species of beetle in the family Cerambycidae. It was described by Pascoe in 1867. It is known from Malaysia and Singapore.

References

M
Beetles described in 1867